Dariusz "Daray" Brzozowski (born 30 January 1980), is a Polish heavy metal drummer. Brzozowski has played with such bands as Vader, Black River, Jelonek, Armagedon, Arysta, Azarath, Faust, Neolithic, Crionics, Autumn: Death, Imperial Age, Kayzen, Crystal Abyss, Nerve, Insidious Disease and Pyorrhoea. He currently plays in Dimmu Borgir, Vesania, Symbolical, Hunter, and Masachist.

He endorses Meinl, Tama, Czarcie Kopyto and Regal Tip. He used to endorse Pearl, Premier, Yamaha, Vic Firth, and Balbex.

Drums setup

Discography 

 With Neolithic
2003 Team 666
 With Dimmu Borgir
 2010 Abrahadabra
 2018 Eonian
 With Black River
 2008 Black River
 2009 Black'n'Roll
 2010 Trash
 With Masachist
 2009 Death March Fury
 2012 Scorned

 With Vader
2004 Beware the Beast
2004 The Beast
2005 The Art of War
2006 Impressions in Blood
2007 And Blood Was Shed in Warsaw
2008 XXV
 With Faust
 2009 From Glory to Infinity
 With Jelonek
 2011 Revenge

 With Hunter
2009 HellWood
2011 XXV lat później
2012 Królestwo
2013 Imperium

 With Pyorrhoea
2004 Desire for Torment
 With Nerve
 2013 Fracture
 With Arysta
 2011 The 5 Ocean
 With Christ Agony
 2016 Legacy

References

External links

Polish heavy metal drummers
Male drummers
Vader (band) members
1980 births
Living people
Dimmu Borgir members
20th-century Polish musicians
21st-century Polish musicians
21st-century drummers